Neprilysin, also known as membrane metallo-endopeptidase (MME), neutral endopeptidase (NEP), cluster of differentiation 10 (CD10), and common acute lymphoblastic leukemia antigen (CALLA) is an enzyme that in humans is encoded by the MME gene. Neprilysin is a zinc-dependent metalloprotease that cleaves peptides at the amino side of hydrophobic residues and inactivates several peptide hormones including glucagon, enkephalins, substance P, neurotensin, oxytocin, and bradykinin. It also degrades the amyloid beta peptide whose abnormal folding and aggregation in neural tissue has been implicated as a cause of Alzheimer's disease. Synthesized as a membrane-bound protein, the neprilysin ectodomain is released into the extracellular domain after it has been transported from the Golgi apparatus to the cell surface.

Neprilysin is expressed in a wide variety of tissues and is particularly abundant in kidney. It is also a common acute lymphocytic leukemia antigen that is an important cell surface marker in the diagnosis of human acute lymphocytic leukemia (ALL). This protein is present on leukemic cells of pre-B phenotype, which represent 85% of cases of ALL.

Hematopoietic progenitors expressing CD10 are considered "common lymphoid progenitors", which means they can differentiate into T, B or natural killer cells. CD10 is of use in hematological diagnosis since it is expressed by early B, pro-B and pre-B lymphocytes, and by lymph node germinal centers. Hematologic diseases in which it is positive include ALL, angioimmunoblastic T cell lymphoma,  Burkitt lymphoma,  chronic myelogenous leukemia in blast crisis (90%),  diffuse large B-cell lymphoma (variable),  follicular center cells (70%),  hairy cell leukemia (10%), and myeloma (some). It tends to be negative in acute myeloid leukemia, chronic lymphocytic leukemia, mantle cell lymphoma, and marginal zone lymphoma. CD10 is found on non-T ALL cells, which derive from pre-B lymphocytes, and in germinal center-related non-Hodgkin lymphoma such as Burkitt lymphoma and follicular lymphoma, but not on leukemia cells or lymphomas, which originate in more mature B cells.

Amyloid beta regulation 
Neprilysin-deficient knockout mice show both Alzheimer's-like behavioral impairment and amyloid-beta deposition in the brain, providing strong evidence for the protein's association with the Alzheimer's disease process. Because neprilysin is thought to be the rate-limiting step in amyloid beta degradation, it has been considered a potential therapeutic target; compounds such as the peptide hormone somatostatin have been identified that increase the enzyme's activity level. Declining neprilysin activity with increasing age may also be explained by oxidative damage, known to be a causative factor in Alzheimer's disease; higher levels of inappropriately oxidized neprilysin have been found in Alzheimer's patients compared to cognitively normal elderly people.

Signaling peptides 

Neprilysin is also associated with other biochemical processes, and is particularly highly expressed in kidney and lung tissues. Inhibitors have been designed with the aim of developing analgesic and antihypertensive agents that act by preventing neprilysin's activity against signaling peptides such as enkephalins, substance P, endothelin, and atrial natriuretic peptide.

Associations have been observed between neprilysin expression and various types of cancer; however, the relationship between neprilysin expression and carcinogenesis remains obscure. In cancer biomarker studies, the neprilysin gene is often referred to as CD10 or CALLA. In some types of cancer, such as metastatic carcinoma and some advanced melanomas, neprilysin is overexpressed; in other types, most notably lung cancers, neprilysin is downregulated, and thus unable to modulate the pro-growth autocrine signaling of cancer cells via secreted peptides such as mammalian homologs related to bombesin.
Some plant extracts (methanol extracts of Ceropegia rupicola, Kniphofia sumarae,  Plectranthus cf barbatus, and an aqueous extract of Pavetta longiflora) were found able to inhibit the enzymatic activity of neutral endopeptidase.

Inhibitors 
Inhibitors have been designed with the aim of developing analgesic and antihypertensive agents that act by preventing neprilysin's activity against signaling peptides such as enkephalins, substance P, endothelin, and atrial natriuretic peptide.

Some are intended to treat heart failure.

 Sacubitril/valsartan (Entresto/LCZ696), which has been tested against enalapril in patients with heart failure.
 Sacubitril (AHU-377), a prodrug which is a component of sacubitril/valsartan
 Sacubitrilat (LBQ657), the active form of sacubitril
 RB-101, an enkephalinase inhibitor, used in scientific research.
 UK-414,495
 Omapatrilat (dual inhibitor of NEP and angiotensin-converting enzyme) developed by BMS did not receive FDA approval due to angioedema safety concerns.
 Ecadotril
Candoxatril

Other dual inhibitors of NEP with ACE/angiotensin receptor are (in 2003) being developed by pharmaceutical companies.

Immunochemistry 
CD10 is used in clinical pathology for diagnostic purpose.

In lymphomas and leukemias 
 Acute lymphoblastic leukemia (ALL) cells are CD10+.
 Follicular lymphoma (follicle centre cell lymphoma) are CD10+.
 Burkitt Lymphoma cells are CD10+.
 CD10+ diffuse large B cell lymphoma (CD10+ DLBCL)
 Marker for germinal center phenotype (CD10, HGAL, BCL6, CD38) are considered a favorable prognostic factor, but CD10+, BCL2+ tumors could have poorer survival. For some authors, CD10 expression in DLBCL does not influence survival.
 Angioimmunoblastic T cell lymphoma (AITL) are CD10+ and distinguishes AITL from other T cell lymphomas (CD10−)
 Some benign T cells can be CD10+

In epithelial tumors 
 Clear cell renal cell carcinoma (Clear cell RCC)
 CD10+ distinguishes renal cell carcinoma, conventional type with eosinophilic morphology from its mimickers. Chromophobe carcinoma and oncocytoma are CD10−.
 Pancreatic tumors
 Solid pseudopapillary tumours are CD10+.
 CD10+ differentiates mucinous cystic neoplasms (CD10+/CK20+) from intraductal papillary mucinous neoplasm of branch duct type (CD10−/CK20-).
 Cutaneous tumors
 CD10 may differentiate basal cell carcinoma (CD10 epithelial staining) from trichoblastoma (CD10 peritumoral stromal staining), basal cell carcinoma with follicular differentiation (CD10 stromal and epithelial staining) and squamous cell carcinoma (strong stromal staining).
 CD10 differentiates CD10+ atypical fibroxanthoma from CD10− spindle cell melanoma and sarcomatoid squamous cell carcinoma.
 Urothelial tumors express CD10 (42-67%).
 CD10 expression is strongly correlated with high tumor grade and stage in urothelial carcinoma of the bladder. CD10 may be associated with tumor progression in bladder cancer pathogenesis.

In other tumors  
 CD10 expression might be one of the characteristics of müllerian system-derived neoplastic mesenchymal cells.
 Normal endometrial stroma
 Endometrial stromal sarcoma (ESS) are CD10+ (Smooth muscle tumors are usually CD10−, but can be CD10+ 
 Malignant müllerian mixed tumor (MMMT)
 Müllerian adenosarcoma
 Uterine high-grade leiomyosarcoma
 Uterine rhabdomyosarcoma
 Vascular tumors
 Epithelioid hemangioendothelioma are mostly CD10+.
 Hemangioblastoma is usually CD10− (metastatic renal cell carcinoma is CD10+)

See also 
 List of histologic stains that aid in diagnosis of cutaneous conditions

References

External links 
 The MEROPS online database for peptidases and their inhibitors: M13.001
 
 

Alzheimer's disease
EC 3.4.24
Tumor markers